Mutasa may refer to:

Didymus Mutasa
Mutasa District in Manicaland Province, Zimbabwe